Zeacumantus is a genus of small to medium-sized sea snails or mud snails, marine gastropod mollusks in the family Batillariidae.

This genus is sometimes still treated as if it were a subgenus of the genus Batillaria (Batillariidae).

Species
Species in the genus include:
 Zeacumantus diemenensis (Quoy, JRC & JP Gaimard, 1834)
 Zeacumantus lutulentus (Kiener, 1841)
 Zeacumantus subcarinatus (Sowerby, 1855)

Synonyms:
 Zeacumantus delicatus Laws, 1950 is a synonym of Pyrazus ebeninus (Bruguière, 1792)

References

External links 

 Ozawa, T., Köhler, F., Reid, D.G. & Glaubrecht, M. (2009). "Tethyan relicts on continental coastlines of the northwestern Pacific Ocean and Australasia: molecular phylogeny and fossil record of batillariid gastropods (Caenogastropoda, Cerithioidea)". Zoologica Scripta 38: 503-525. .

Batillariidae
Taxa named by Harold John Finlay